Aadum Koothu is a 2006 Tamil drama romance film directed by T. V. Chandran and starring Navya Nair, Cheran, Prakash Raj, Aari Arujunan, Seeman, and Manorama. The film premiered at the 37th International Film Festival of India in 2006 and had a limited release across theatres in 2008. Later, Zee Tamizh telecast this film. The film received critical praise and won the National Film Award for Best Feature Film in Tamil.

Plot
The film unfolds from the life of college student Manimekhala, a village girl who can see what others don't. A serious reader of modern literature from a southern district of Tamil Nadu, Manimekhala sees visions that no one believes. Later, incidents prove that what she says become true. She creates scenes whenever she has these illusions. The illusions are like a movie projected on an imaginary screen from her bangle presented by her fiancé Muthu. The bangle is actually made from molten celluloid. This projected movie roughly reveals the story of a couple of street performers in love and tortured by a lustful Zamindar, who tonsures the girl's head.

Even on the marriage stage, her bangle projects such a show specially for her, and she creates a scene ending in the cancellation of the marriage ceremony. Later, Muthu accompanies her to investigate what really happens. It leads to an old retired schoolmaster, who narrates the story of the dropped movie. In the later 1970s, this movie was actually made by an enthusiastic young director Gnanasekaran, and dropped midway due to a mishap. This retired man was enacting the role of the Zamindar in the film, and the plot was based on a real incident. The heroine is at first reluctant, when the director/hero tells her that her head will be really shaved and no special effects business. After persuasion, she agrees for the sake of reality. Meanwhile, the real Zamindar's son comes to the shooting spot and objects, stating that the real incident maligning his dad should not be canned. The master pacifies him saying that it is only an imaginary plot.

But the Zamindar's son returns with his bunch of hooligans and creates havoc in the shooting spot. The tonsured heroine is mentally disturbed and hangs herself, and the shooting comes to a halt. The director disappears, only to return as a Naxalite to annihilate the wicked Zamindar along with his unshaved revolutionary comrades. But he is encountered by the cops and shot down, and the period was the Emergency.

Manimekhala suddenly wields a camera and becomes a docu film maker and goes to the particular village again. There she meets the real Dalit woman, who was tonsured during the Zamindar's period, and interviews her. And she repeats the dialogues prompted by Manimekhala with a theatrical accent and a huge white wig. The Zamindar's grandson is also interviewed.

Cast

References

External links
 Cast and Crew at Bollywood Hungama

Films directed by T. V. Chandran
2006 films
2000s Tamil-language films
Films about reincarnation
Best Tamil Feature Film National Film Award winners